The Valtos Sandstone Formation is a Middle Jurassic (Bathonian) formation found in the Inner Hebrides of Scotland. It is the thickest member of the Great Estuarine Group. The lithology consists of sets of approximately 6 metre thick cross bedded sandstone, capped by thin shelly limestones containing bivalves of the genus Neomiodon  Dinosaur remains are among the fossils that have been recovered from the formation, although none have yet been referred to a specific genus.

See also

 List of dinosaur-bearing rock formations
 List of stratigraphic units with indeterminate dinosaur fossils
 List of fossiliferous stratigraphic units in Scotland

Footnotes

References
 Weishampel, David B.; Dodson, Peter; and Osmólska, Halszka (eds.): The Dinosauria, 2nd, Berkeley: University of California Press. 861 pp. .
 

Jurassic Scotland
Sandstone formations
Bathonian Stage